A list of notable films produced in Greece in the 1950s.

1950s

External links
 Greek film at the IMDb

1950s
Greek
Films